Nik Tominec (born 26 March 1991) is a Swiss handball player for Kadetten Schaffhausen and the Swiss national team.

He represented Switzerland at the 2020 European Men's Handball Championship.

References

1991 births
Living people
Swiss male handball players
Sportspeople from Lucerne
Expatriate handball players
Swiss expatriate sportspeople in Slovenia
Competitors at the 2013 Mediterranean Games
Mediterranean Games silver medalists for Croatia
Mediterranean Games medalists in handball